The Emotional thought method (Spanish: Pensamiento emocional) develops a group of activities that can be used in a personal or group-oriented way. This method concerns developing Emotional intelligence in a similar way that Daniel Goleman (1995) proposed in his book Emotional intelligence, a bestseller book written in 1995.

Origins

The emotional thought method was created by Carlos Hué, a Spanish psychologist who is a teacher in the University of Zaragoza. This method is explained in the book Pensamiento emocional. Un método para el desarrollo de la autoestima y el liderazgo (Hué, 2007). Unfortunately, this book has not yet been translated into English. Carlos Hué gathers a lot of exercises in this method in order to develop emotional skills.

The Emotional thought method

Emotional Intelligence is based on several competencies intended to help a person gain success in personal, professional and social life. These kinds of competencies are usually acquired in the earliest education and throughout adult life, but they are not taught in a specific way. The reason is that these competencies are said not to be taught, since they are characteristic of each individual's personal maturation.

There are a great number of training actions favoured by companies, public administrations, entities, institutions and social agents that develop some of these competences. However, there are not complete methods to train emotional competencies.

The Emotional thought method illustrates that the emotional competencies can be learnt throughout life, so they can be taught, learnt and even evaluated.

Emotional competencies

This method proposes seven emotional competencies, four referred to oneself like self-knowledge, self-evaluation, emotional control, and personal motivation; and three more referred to the others, as:  knowledge of others, appreciation of others, and control of them.

 Self-knowledge is the first competence to develop and will naturally be through the knowledge of a person's own capacities, skills, personality features, interests, goals, etc. This point is usually ignored in the education programs. It includes introspection, aptitudinal self-knowledge, emotional self-knowledge, self-criticism, and awareness of oneself.
 Self-evaluation the second competence of this Emotional thought method. This competence has a basic relationship with the concept of self and self-esteem. In this method, self-esteem is the real driving force of people's behaviour. When people feel unhappy, they feel they do not have enough strength to work, to make relationships with others or to live. On the contrary, when people feel happy with themselves, then they feel that they can face new challenges and projects and get involved in life problems. This competence is the result of developing sensibility, sensuality, sexuality, a right aptitudinal and emotional evaluation, optimism, happiness and self-esteem.
 Emotional control is the third one. Emotions are the tool used by animals to survive. Emotions provide animals and people a quick response against their enemies. Stress, fear and anxiety are emotions that help to avoid external attacks through reacting with the alert, retreat or, even, the attack to the dangers that may come from the outside. But according to the method, if people do not manage these primary emotions, they can be managed by them. So this competence develops three emotional skills as: motor inhibition, self-control and mental control.
 Personal motivation is the last competence developed by the Emotional thought method in order to reach targets. Motivation is the force of the behaviour and of the life of people and that is why our interests and desires influence the actions we carry out every day. Expectations, dreams and enthusiasm (specially this last one) are the real force to work, to love, to live. The Emotional thinking method presents a set of competencies to be developed, as: activation, productivity, quality, instrumental tools, globality, planning, culture, innovation, interests' wideness, determination and evaluation.
 There are three competences in this emotional method oriented to how to make a relationship with other people. So the fifth competence in the Emotional thought method is Knowledge of the others. The success in life depends extremely on how people get along with others living close to them. So, it is very important to know their personality, what are they interested in, which are their needs. Knowledge of the personality of others, knowledge of their aptitudes, empathy, communication ability, social analysis, appreciation of diversity are some of the abilities developed in this fifth part of the method.
 Appreciation of the other is the sixth competence of the Emotional thought method. The way you appreciate the people is a determining competence to increase your position in the relationship made with them. In this method, ten abilities are proposed for the development of this competence. They are structured in four groups.
 The first group concerns the necessary capacities for a relationship: approximation, affability and tolerance.
 The second group includes the capacities for creating a link: confidence, comprehension and sociability.
 The third group includes three levels of approximation: companionship, friendship and love.
 Finally, there is responsibility, as the summary of all of them.

 The last competence developed in the Emotional thought method is: Control of others. Many people criticise this competence because they say that it is not respectful with them. But everyone wants to persuade other people to do what they are interested in. So the seventh competence of this method develops the capacity to have relations, the capacity for organizating groups, the capacity to solve conflicts, and, especially, leadership.

These seven emotional competencies are developed through several exercises proposed in the Emotional thought method, as much as in the book of doctor Hué quoted before, as in the TREIN project mentioned below. This method is a systematic project to develop all emotional competencies needed by every people, in the work, in the family, between our friends, in our life.

A European application

Recently there has been developed a European project translated into English, French, Italian, Swedish, German, Bulgarian, Romanian and Spanish, of course. This project is named as TREIN (Training in Emotional Intelligence), and it can be found in a website below. So, this Emotional thought method, as well as being appropriate to develop mental health of everyone, is suitable in work training. This is suitable to teach emotional competences to employers as to employees. Also, it is a good method to decrease work accidents and to increase the labour productivity.

Bibliography

 Goleman, Daniel, 1995. Emotional intelligence.New York: Bantam Books.
 Goleman, Daniel, 2006. Social intelligence:  the new science of human relationships.New York: Bantam Books.
 Hué, Carlos, 2007. Pensamiento emocional. Un método para el desarrollo de la autoestima y el liderazgo. Zaragoza: Mira.

External links
TREIN project

Emotion